Cubeo may refer to:

 Cubeo people, an ethnic group of Colombia
 Cubeo language, a language of Colombia